Impatiens halongensis is a species of the family Balsaminaceae native to Vietnam. It was collected in Hạ Long Bay in 1999, for which the species is named.

Description
Impatiens halongensis grows as a perennial plant. The flowers are white, with yellow edges sometimes tinged with green.

Distribution and habitat
Impatiens halongensis is endemic to Vietnam, where is it is confined to the islands of Hạ Long Bay, a UNESCO World Heritage Site. Its habitat is in limestone soil.

References

halongensis
Endemic flora of Vietnam
Plants described in 2000